NGC 96 is a lenticular galaxy estimated to be about 290 million light-years away in the constellation of Andromeda. It was discovered by Guillaume Bigourdan in 1884 and its apparent magnitude is 17.

References

External links
 

0096
01429
Lenticular galaxies
+04-02-014
Andromeda (constellation)
18841024
Discoveries by Guillaume Bigourdan